Human identification may mean:

 Biometric identification
 Face perception
 Face recognition
 Forensic identification

See also 
 Identification (disambiguation)
Identification card
Personally identifiable information